Acme Aircraft Co was an aircraft manufacturer founded by Hugh Crawford and Roger Keeney in Torrance, California. After 1953 the company was known as Sierradyne.

References

Defunct aircraft manufacturers of the United States
Companies based in Los Angeles County, California